OfficeMax is an American office supplies retailer founded in 1988. It is now a subsidiary of The ODP Corporation, which is headquartered in Boca Raton, Florida. As of December 2012, OfficeMax operated 941 stores in 47 states, Puerto Rico, the U.S. Virgin Islands and Mexico. In 2012, net sales were $6.9 billion, down from $8.3 billion in 2008.

On February 20, 2013, an all-stock merger between Office Depot and OfficeMax was announced. The merger was completed on November 5, 2013, creating the largest U.S. office-supplies chain. The OfficeMax name continues to serve as a brand of The ODP Corporation.

History
On April 1, 1988, OfficeMax was founded in Cleveland, Ohio, by Bob Hurwitz and Michael Feuer. Hurwitz served as executive chairman and chief executive officer, and Feuer was the president and chief operating officer. On July 5, 1988, OfficeMax opened its first retail store in the Golden Gate Shopping Center in Mayfield Heights, Ohio; after being open for 27 years, this location closed on May 16, 2015. Hurwitz left the company in 1993 and Feuer became the chairman and chief executive officer.

OfficeMax grew by acquisition with Office World first in November 1990, with Office World executive and Montgomery Ward becoming minority shareholders. In 1990, Office Square stores were purchased from Kmart, in exchange for a 22% equity stake. In 1991, Kmart increased its stake in OfficeMax to 92%. In January 1992, OfficeMax acquired five sites from Highland Superstores in Boston. OW Office Warehouse, a Virginia-based regional chain, was acquired on June 30, 1992. The company then acquired BizMart, its largest acquisition (104 stores) to date, in 1993 from Intelligent Electronics. On August 16, 1993, OfficeMax joined Kmart and most of the other Kmart-owned banners in the "largest power center" Kmart operated in Utica, Michigan. OfficeMax acquired a 19% stake in Corporate Express, a contract stationer. In May 1994, Kmart put a plan in front of its stockholders to sell 20% to 30% of each of its specialty store subsidiaries shares on the open market to pay down debt and fund future expansion of the subsidiaries. Kmart's shareholders turn down the proposal at their June 3 annual meeting. In November 1994, FurnitureMax store within a store concept begins testing in the Cleveland market. In 1995, Kmart sold off 51% of OfficeMax shares, spinning off the company and became a NYSE-(OMX) publicly traded corporation, based in Shaker Heights, Ohio.

Public corporation
In 1995, OfficeMax became one of a handful of companies doing business through internetMCI. Around this time Kmart sold the remaining 25% of the OfficeMax shares it held. On July 14, 1996, a new kiosk program called BatteryMax was test launched in two Phoenix stores. BatteryMax were operated by Batteries for Everything.

OfficeMax also filed lawsuits for infringement for use of the "Max" name against Med Max and Circuit City for CarMax, its used car business. For the next few years OfficeMax and its rivals, Staples and Office Depot, continued to open new stores, saturating the market segment.

OfficeMax developed regional delivery centers, and invested in its super-regional PowerMax distribution centers in Las Vegas, Nevada, Hazleton, Pennsylvania, and Birmingham, Alabama after litigation began with previous logistics and shipping provider.

A small sized store concept, OfficeMax PDQ, test was launched in Woodmere, Ohio, in late June 1998.

Purchase by Boise Cascade
From 2001, OfficeMax began closing underperforming stores in some neighborhoods and in regions where it did not have a strong presence. In 2003, OfficeMax was acquired for $1.3 billion by Boise Cascade Office Products Corporation, who later rebranded themselves OfficeMax.

Merger with Office Depot
It was announced February 20, 2013, that OfficeMax and Office Depot would combine in an all-stock deal, creating the largest U.S. office-supplies chain. However, as of May 2, 2013, a lawsuit filed by a stockholder, Hollander v. OfficeMax Inc et al., U.S. District Court, Northern District of Illinois, No. 13-3330 was filed to block the merger, which would pay all OfficeMax shareholders 2.69 shares of Office Depot in exchange for a single share in OfficeMax. Eric Hollander said in a statement "OfficeMax, if properly exposed to the market for corporate control, would bring a price materially in excess of the amount offered in the proposed transaction..." Office Depot said on May 5, 2013, that it would hold a special meeting with shareholders after the staff of the U.S. Securities and Exchange Commission finished reviewing documents relating to its merger with OfficeMax. On November 5, 2013, the merger was completed. On December 10, 2013, Office Depot, Inc. announced that it had chosen Boca Raton, Florida for its global headquarters post-merger, closing the OfficeMax headquarters in Naperville, IL.

On February 4, 2015, Office Depot agreed to be acquired by rival Staples for $6.3 billion. However, on December 7, the Federal Trade Commission voted to block the merger. On May 16, 2016, Office Depot announced that the merger agreement between Staples and Office Depot had been terminated.

New Zealand branch closures
On 26 August 2020, OfficeMax announced that it would be closing all 14 of its New Zealand branches and shift operations online in response to growing online usage and the COVID-19 pandemic in New Zealand.

See also
 Grand & Toy — OfficeMax's Canadian subsidiary (founded 1882 and acquired in 1996)

References
Notes

Further reading

External links
 

1988 establishments in Ohio
1991 mergers and acquisitions
1995 initial public offerings
2013 mergers and acquisitions
American companies established in 1988
Companies based in Boca Raton, Florida
Companies based in Naperville, Illinois
Companies formerly listed on the New York Stock Exchange
Office Depot
Office supply retailers of the United States
Retail companies established in 1988
Sears Holdings